Stenolis theobromae is a species of beetle in the family Cerambycidae. It was described by Lara and Shenefelt in 1964.

References

Stenolis
Beetles described in 1964